Events in the year 2020 in Uruguay.

Incumbents
 President: Tabaré Vázquez (until 1 March) - Luis Lacalle Pou (starting 1 March)
 Vice President: Lucía Topolansky (until 1 March) - Beatriz Argimón (starting 1 March)

Events 
27 January – 2 February – The tennis tournament 2020 Punta Open was held in Punta del Este.
1 March – Luis Lacalle Pou took office as President of the Republic.
10 March – Uruguay left the Union of South American Nations.
13 March – First four cases of COVID-19 were confirmed.
24 July – 9 August – Uruguay was scheduled to compete at the 2020 Summer Olympics in Tokyo, having qualified in sailing.

Ongoing events 

 COVID-19 pandemic in Uruguay

Deaths

17 January – Fernando Miguel Gil Eisner, Roman Catholic bishop (b. 1953).
11 February – Carlos Julio Pereyra, politician (b. 1922).
28 March – Rodolfo González Rissotto, 71, politician (National Party), Director of Education at the Ministry of Education and Culture (1990-1994) and Minister of National Defense (1995); first case of COVID-19 in Uruguay
20 May – Juan Justo Amaro, politician (b. 1930).
27 May – Federico García Vigil, composer and conductor (b. 1941).
4 August – Alberto Zumarán, politician (b. 1940).
10 August – Jacobo Langsner, playwright (b. 1927).

References

 
2020s in Uruguay
Years of the 21st century in Uruguay
Uruguay
Uruguay